John Molina may refer to:
 John John Molina, Puerto Rican boxer
 John Molina Jr., American boxer